The Professional Darts Corporation (PDC) is a professional darts organisation in the United Kingdom, established in 1992 when a group of leading players split from the British Darts Organisation (BDO) to form what was initially called the World Darts Council (WDC). Sports promoter Eddie Hearn is the PDC chairman.

The PDC developed and holds several championship competitions, including the annual PDC World Darts Championship, the World Matchplay, World Grand Prix, UK Open, Premier League, and Grand Slam. It also runs its own world rankings based on players' performances.

History

Darts had experienced a boom in the 1980s. A number of tournaments were televised on BBC and ITV, which allowed the top players to make a full time living from the sport and turn professional. However, darts steadily dropped from television schedules and by 1989 the only remaining televised event was the annual Embassy World Championship. Some of the players felt that not enough was being done by the governing body, the British Darts Organisation, to encourage new sponsors into the sport and arrange more television coverage. BDO chairman Olly Croft stated "I don't owe any dart players a living" and refused to guarantee more televised tournaments or permit the players to organise their own.

As a result, 16 professional players, including every previous BDO world champion who was still active in the game, created their own darts organisation, the World Darts Council (WDC), in January 1992. The players were led by sports promoters Tommy Cox and Dick Allix, both of whom used their own money to fund the fledgling organisation.

They wanted to appoint a PR consultant to improve the image of the game. The 1993 Embassy World Championship was the last time there was one unified world championship. The WDC players wore their new insignia on their sleeves during the tournament but were told to remove them by the BDO. The WDC players decided that if they were not going to be recognised by the BDO they would no longer play in the Embassy tournament.

The BDO took the step of banning the rebel players from playing in county darts and even threatened to ban any player who participated in exhibition events with WDC players.

Tomlin order
The WDC players took the matter to court in a dispute which accrued large and perhaps unaffordable costs during a protracted legal process. The two bodies reached an out-of-court settlement on 30 June 1997 in the form of a Tomlin order.

The BDO recognised the WDC and agreed that all players shall have the freedom of choice as to which open events they wish to play in. The WDC dropped its claim to be a world governing body and renamed itself the Professional Darts Corporation. The PDC accepted and recognized the World Darts Federation (WDF) as the governing body for the sport of darts worldwide, and the BDO the governing body for darts in the UK. The stated purpose of the agreement was to promote the freedom of individual darts players to participate freely in open competition.

Another condition of this Tomlin order is that the top 16 players, and any Home Country players ranked between 17 and 32 in each year's BDO Championship, and the top 16 players in each year's PDC Championship, shall not be permitted to enter the other competition in the immediate following year.

Despite this condition, Raymond van Barneveld switched to the PDC within weeks of reaching the 2006 BDO final, later playing in (and winning) the 2007 PDC World Championship – the Tomlin order should have made him ineligible to play.

There was further controversy following the 2007 BDO World Championship, when Jelle Klaasen announced that he would be switching to the PDC. As a BDO World Champion, he signed a three-year deal in 2006 to return to the Lakeside event. The BDO threatened to take legal action for breach of contract, but with previous damage and costs incurred by other legal cases it has become less likely that any action will be taken in future with regards to player contracts and the Tomlin Order. 2007 semi-finalist Mervyn King also moved to the PDC, seemingly against the contracted condition that semi-finalists and finalists were bound to appear the next year.

In January 2012, the PDC invited the four semi-finalists of the BDO world championships, after obtaining a written agreement to release any player without penalty. Ted Hankey was the first player to move, as well as several players (who were not guaranteed a pro tour card due to not reaching the BDO semi finals) entering the PDC qualifying school, including Dean Winstanley, Tony West, Steve West, and Stuart Kellett.

Television coverage
Following the breakaway groups first televised event in 1992 (the Lada UK Masters on Anglia Television), satellite broadcaster Sky Sports signed a deal to exclusively cover three PDC tournaments each year. To capitalise on its investment, the channel introduced a number of new techniques to make the coverage more interesting for armchair fans.

Unlike the BDO world championship, which was covered via the general entertainment BBC Two channel, Sky's dedicated sports channel allowed the PDC matches to be covered in their entirety. Over ten hours per day of live darts on Sky Sports is not uncommon. The British Darts Organisation's events were more limited to selected matches and highlights, although in recent years the BBC increased its interactive TV coverage allowing viewers to see many more events live.

Sky television is an advertisement and subscription based channel, and generally after each set a commercial break is taken. Planet Funk's 2000 single "Chase the Sun" is played in the auditorium and it has become a cult track amongst darts fans, who tend to dance along to the tune during the breaks.

Currently Sky Sports broadcasts six tournaments live each year in both Ireland and the United Kingdom. PDC events are also televised in Australia, Germany, Hungary, India, Japan, the Netherlands, Norway, Singapore, South Africa and the United States (One World Sports).

The PDC signed a three-year deal with ITV in 2007 with the inaugural Grand Slam of Darts from 2007 and the inaugural Players Championship from 2009. The matches are shown live on ITV4 with highlights on ITV1. ITV being an advertisement channel like Sky Sports, commercial breaks are taken after 5 legs; the tournaments that ITV cover do not play in sets. The Fratellis 2006 single "Chelsea Dagger" is played during the breaks on ITV.  In 2010, Bravo signed a contract to show the European Championships.

In 2007, Sky Sports decided to extend their coverage of the Premier League Darts to 2010 following the high number of viewers to previous tournaments.

In February 2016, it was announced the BBC would cover the PDC for the first time with a new tournament being formed using the top 8 players on the PDC Order of Merit after the World Matchplay, known as the Champions League of Darts. As a result, the BBC dropped coverage of the BDO World Darts Championship, which they covered from 1978 to 2016 (this was the original World Championship prior to the formation of the PDC). DJ Ötzi's "Hey! Baby" is played during the breaks on the BBC.

Cameras

Sky Sports introduced more cameras to cover the sport, and many of these innovations have been copied by other broadcasters.

Unique flight cams show the trajectory of the dart through the air in slow motion to sometimes surprising results. A tiny camera has also been inserted into the dartboard itself beside the number 16 – one of the most common doubles – that shows the darts being thrown towards the board. Sky Sports have also used a player cam; a tiny camera was fitted to Dennis Priestley's shirt to capture his view of the action while playing.

Elsewhere, floating video cameras capture the action of the watching crowds. Spectators become far more animated and vocal than their BDO counterparts, often acting similar to a football crowd, while holding up humorous placards – often featuring corny puns – regarding the players, and chanting or singing various songs related to the players or to the event in general. Some supporters even wear face paint or crazy costumes or they dress up as their favourite player via their trademark attire or customary nickname.

The players' wives have also been a focus for the cameras, as they cheered or screeched on their husbands. In January 2005, Sky One commissioned a programme entitled Darts Players' Wives, primarily focusing on the wives and their relationships.

In December 2008, Sky started to broadcast darts in High Definition (with the exception of the final Las Vegas Desert Classic in 2009), and in July 2010 (at the World Matchplay), broadcast the Semi Finals and Final in 3D to around 1,000 licensed premises in the UK and Republic of Ireland.

Another frequent cam is a split-screen camera, with the players on the right, and the dartboard on the left.  If the first two darts hit the triple 20, the camera will zoom in to the spot before the third dart is thrown.

Commentators
John Gwynne has covered all PDC events from the inaugural 1992 competition until his retirement in 2013. Dave Lanning covered all events up until December 2010, when he retired. Contrary to popular belief, long-time BBC darts commentator Sid Waddell did not switch allegiances to Sky until after the 1994 BDO World Championship. He brought his own unique brand of commentary to the game, and was a cult figure amongst darts fans and sport fans alike. He continued to commentate until his death in 2012. The current commentators on Sky include Rod Studd, Stuart Pyke and Adam Smith, retired player Wayne Mardle and former World Champions John Part and Mark Webster. Jeff Stelling was the original presenter of Sky Sports' darts coverage, before Dave Clark took over in 2002. Clark retired in 2020, since when Emma Paton has been the lead presenter. In addition, the 2005 Premier League was fronted by Gary Newbon.  

ITV events were fronted by Matt Smith from 2007 to 2014 but are now hosted by Jacqui Oatley from 2015 who became the first regular female darts host in the UK.  Commentary for ITV has been provided by John Rawling, Alan Warriner-Little & Pyke since 2007 with Chris Mason joining the coverage in 2008. Former darts commentators for ITV include Jim Proudfoot, Peter Drury and Steve Beaton. Ned Boulting presents features and interviews and deputises if the presenter is unavailable.

BBC Sport showed the inaugural PDC Champions League of Darts on BBC One and BBC Two, with 16 hours of coverage over two days presented by BBC Final Score presenter Jason Mohammad alongside PDC professionals Mark Webster, Paul Nicholson and Warriner-Little, commentary by long time BBC darts commentator Vassos Alexander and PDC online reporter and commentator Dan Dawson with reports by Caroline Barker.

Bravo employed James Richardson and Dave Gorman to front its coverage until the channel closed in 2011.

Image

The PDC sought to attract a younger audience of all genders for darts and market the game as a night out rather than just as a sporting event. Through the years, it was not uncommon to see politicians, musicians, football players, boxers and other sporting personalities attending their events. The British Darts Organisation have subsequently sought to emulate most of these innovations.

Players enter matches with their own signature theme music whilst flanked by security men and, until 2017, female valets down to the oche. A "big-time" atmosphere was also created by using smoke machines and pyrotechnics during these sometimes elaborate entrances, similar to those used in boxing or wrestling.

At the oche, players only drink iced water during matches. Though this was intended to further the game's image, which had been tarnished by players' reputation for consuming large quantities of alcohol. The water is also needed to prevent dehydration: with the many lights and packed crowds, temperatures have been measured at over 38-degree Celsius (100-degree Fahrenheit) during some games.

Inside the venues, action is relayed via giant video screens for the large crowds. The BDO now also has video screens, while maintaining their traditional "light boards" of lightbulbs, showing where each dart lands for the benefit of the crowd.

Nicknames
Eric Bristow, the most successful player in the first few years of the World Championship, had his nickname "The Crafty Cockney" emblazoned on the back of his shirt. Very few dart players had their own nicknames until the Professional Darts Corporation circuit made it almost customary for every player to acquire a nickname. This helps to create a new generation of characters with which its audience could identify.

Sky TV commentator Sid Waddell attempted to christen Phil Taylor "The Crafty Potter" – referring to him being both a protégé of Bristow and originating from the Potteries. However, the tag never caught on and it was not until a later tournament that he came out to the tune The Power by Snap! that his nickname was accidentally born.

Jamie Harvey from Scotland became "Bravedart" – a play on words from Mel Gibson's Braveheart film. Sky Sports even filmed vignettes where a kilt wearing Jamie had his face painted blue and ran through woods throwing his darts whilst looking menacing.

As the only player to wear a shirt, tie and waistcoat whilst playing, Rod Harrington's "Prince of Style" tag appeared apt.

Though originally from the BDO circuit, Wayne Mardle is known as "Hawaii Five-O-One" due to his colourful Hawaiian shirts (a play on words on Hawaii Five-O and the starting score in a leg of darts).

Bob Anderson, now living in Clevedon in Somerset, is known as The Limestone Cowboy, after the limestone hills of Wiltshire where Bob used to live, and the fact that he enjoys Country and Western music. This was once taken even further, with Anderson once walking to the stage accompanied by a horse.

Current tournaments
The Professional Darts Corporation has continued to increase its annual UK televised tournaments in recent years: The World Championship, The Premier League, World Cup of Darts, World Grand Prix and World Matchplay are all covered live by Sky Sports. The US Open was shown on Challenge in 2007 and Nuts TV in 2008. Bravo broadcast the European Championships for the first time in 2010, after ITV4 televised the first running in 2008. ITV 4 won back the coverage for the European Championship; they also show live coverage of the World Series of Darts, Players Championship, UK Open and the Masters.

Ranked tournaments

World Championship

The World Championship is a single-elimination seeded tournament beginning in mid December and finishing in early January. It is the biggest of the PDC tournaments and has the largest prize fund of any darts competition. Held at the Circus Tavern, Purfleet between 1994 and 2007, the championship moved to a bigger venue at Alexandra Palace from 2008.

Phil Taylor has dominated this tournament, reaching the final for the first 14 years between 1994 and 2007 and winning fourteen titles, including eight successive titles between 1995 and 2002. The PDC World Champions have also shared eight BDO World Championships between them, with Van Barneveld winning four, Taylor two, and Part and Priestley one each. These are usually added to each player's haul when describing their achievements – hence Taylor is a 16-time champion, van Barneveld 5, Part 3 and Priestley 2.

Previous Winners (1994–2023)

UK Open

Held each year in June at the Reebok Stadium in Bolton (2003–2013), and from 2014 in March at Butlins, Minehead, the UK Open is played over three days with 168 players in a single elimination tournament. After each round a draw is held where there is no protection for seeded players. This has earned it the nickname The FA Cup of darts. Phil Taylor is the most successful player in the tournament's history, with five victories.

Previous Winners (2003–23)

World Matchplay

Crowds exceeding 2,000 in number assemble at the Winter Gardens in Blackpool, the longest serving venue in the PDC. Matches are contested over legs rather than sets, presenting the prospect of some surprising results and upsets. Phil Taylor has been the dominant player in this event, winning 16 titles and being undefeated in his first 15 finals.

Previous Winners (1994–2022)

World Grand Prix

The World Grand Prix replaced the World Pairs event in 1998. Its original venue was the Casino Rooms in Rochester, Kent until 1999, with one staging in Rosslare in 2000 before moving in 2001 to its current home at the CityWest Hotel in Dublin, Ireland. However, owing to the COVID-19 pandemic, the tournament has been back in England since 2020.

This tournament has shorter opening rounds and players must commence and finish each leg on a double including the option of the bull, which is a format not used in any other major televised event. Taylor has dominated the event since its inception, with 11 victories.

Previous Winners (1998–2022)

Grand Slam of Darts

Introduced in 2007, the Grand Slam was the first tournament staged in the UK to feature players from the two different organisations, the PDC and BDO. Players who had reached the finals of each organisations major tournaments for the previous two years were invited to compete in the Grand Slam. It is held over 9 days during November and shown live on Sky Sports. The first four tournaments were shown live on ITV4, the 2007 Grand Slam of Darts was ITV's first networked darts tournament since pulling the plug on darts coverage in 1988.

Previous Winners (2007–22)

Players Championship Finals

Introduced in 2009, this tournament was open to the top 32 players on the Players Championship Order of Merit until 2015. In 2016 the tournament was expanded to 64 players still using the Players Championship Order of Merit. It is broadcast live on ITV4.

Previous Winners (2009–22)

European Championship

The European Championship is a tournament that allows the top players in Europe to compete against the top players in the PDC Order of Merit. In 2016 it changed to the top 32 in the European tour Order of Merit. It started in 2008 and for the first six years had a £200,000 prize fund. It has increased since then. Phil Taylor won the first four editions of the tournament, before Simon Whitlock scooped his first, and so far only, major title in 2012.

Previous Winners (2008–22)

Non-ranked tournaments

The Masters

The Masters is a non-ranking darts tournament featuring the Top 24 players in the world, from the PDC Order of Merit. The first event was held between 1–3 November 2013 at the Royal Highland Centre in Edinburgh, Scotland. Since 2015 it has been held at the Marshall Arena, Milton Keynes and been the first tournament after the World Championship.

Previous Winners (2013–23)

Premier League Darts

In 2005, Sky Sports launched the Premier League Darts television programme. For five months, ten of the biggest names from the PDC circuit compete in a league table, with matches held across the country at different venues. Phil Taylor topped the table after the weekly rounds for the first eight instances the Premier League has been staged, going on to win the play-offs six times. Taylor's reign ended when Michael van Gerwen joined the league in 2013 and topped the table after the weekly rounds in each of the seven times since, winning five times. Glen Durrant was the third player to top the table, doing so in his debut year in 2020. Jonny Clayton became the fourth in 2022.

Previous Winners (2005–22)

World Series of Darts

The World Series of Darts is a series of tournaments taking place on various continents. These tournaments are non-ranked. The field of players usually exists out of a number of eight PDC top-players participating on invitation, complemented by another eight national qualifiers. Since 2015, the players earn points over the tour to compete in the World Series of Darts Finals at the end of the year.

World Cup of Darts

One of three new tournaments for 2010, players from 24 countries compete for a prize fund of £150,000. The qualifiers are drawn from the PDC Order of Merit. Sky Sports screen the tournament, which rivals the WDF World Cup. England and the Netherlands have won the title on four occasions, with the pairing of Phil Taylor and Adrian Lewis triumphant each time for England, and Raymond van Barneveld being involved in all four Dutch wins. In 2019, Scotland became just the third nation to lift the trophy with a victory over the Republic of Ireland in the final. Wales became the fourth winning nation in 2020, when they whitewashed England in the final, and Australia became the fifth and first non-European nation to win the event in 2022.

Previous Winners (2010, 2012–2022)

PDC World Youth Championship

The second of the new tournaments for 2010 was open to all darts players, from both the BDO and PDC, aged between 18 and 21. The final was televised live on Sky Sports at Alexandra Palace before the final of the World Championship, in later years before the final of the Premier League. The two finalists will also be invited to become PDC ProTour card holders and would receive sponsorship from Rileys Dartzones, the PDC's staging partners in this event. They will also be invited to compete in the Grand Slam of Darts. In 2015 the age limit was changed to under 23.

Dimitri Van den Bergh became the first player to defend his title by beating Martin Schindler in the final 6–3 though he could not retain it for a third time due to his age.

Previous Winners (2011–22)

Women's World Matchplay
As part of their ever increasing support of the women's game, the PDC unveiled the Women's World Matchplay, a tournament for the Top 8 ladies on the PDC Women's Series Order of Merit. The tournament was played on the same day as the final of the main World Matchplay.

Previous Winners (2022–)

PDC Pro Tour

The PDC Pro Tour is a series of non-televised tournaments. The prize fund is £75,000 for most tournaments and features up to 32 boards in action on an arena floor, hence their nickname "floor tournament". With shorter matches and the floor set up, a different kind of pressure applies compared to televised events and a different set of results can be produced. For instance, Barrie Bates was the PDC Floor Player of the Year in 2006 with Colin Lloyd and Mick McGowan also nominated – none of whom won a major during the year. The 2020 calendar will feature features 30 Players Championships and 13 European Tour events. The European Tour events are different to the Players Championships and are played on a stage in front of an often sizeable crowd.

Past tournaments

Las Vegas Desert Classic (2002–09)

The Mandalay Bay Resort and Casino, Las Vegas, Nevada was the setting for the Las Vegas Desert Classic each July from 2002 to 2009. It furthered the PDC's aim to develop a world darts circuit.

Previous Winners (2002–09)

PDC Unicorn Women’s World Championship

The PDC Unicorn Women's World Championship was open to all female darts players from both the BDO and PDC. The 32 qualifiers played down to the last 2 in a floor tournament and the final were televised live on Sky Sports before the final of the World Matchplay. The two finalists were also invited to become PDC ProTour card holders for 2011 and 2012 and would receive sponsorship from Rileys Dartzones, the PDC's staging partners in this event. They were also invited to compete in the 2010 Grand Slam of Darts.

The first PDC Women's World Championship, in 2010, was won by Stacy Bromberg who beat Tricia Wright 6–5. The match was played after the semi-finals of the 2010 World Matchplay in Blackpool. It was first to six legs of which Bromberg was 5–3 down before making a comeback to win 6–5.

Previous Winners (2010)

World Series of Darts (2006)

The predecessor of what would be renamed the US Open in 2007. Phil Taylor won the event.

Previous Winners

US Open (2007–08)

The US Open was a tournament introduced in 2007 to replace the World Series of Darts. The World Series ran for just one year in 2006. Phil Taylor won the US Open in 2007 and 2008. The tournament was reduced down to Players Championship status for the 2009 and 2010 editions.

Previous Winners

Championship League Darts (2008–13)

Started in 2008, the Championship League Darts offered the players outside the top 8 in the PDC Order of Merit to compete for the championship. It was also the first tournament to be broadcast only by the internet.This tournament was discontinued after the 2013 edition.

Previous Winners (2008–13)

Champions League of Darts (2016–19)

A new event staged for the first time at the Motorpoint Arena Cardiff in Cardiff on 24–25 September 2016 featured the top 8 players in the PDC Order of Merit. It was the first ever PDC event to be shown live on the BBC.

Previous Winners (2016–19)

Other tournaments and contests

Champion versus Champion
There have been two head-to-head matches bringing both respective world champions together in non-affiliated contests.

Billed as the Match of the Century, Phil Taylor beat Raymond van Barneveld 21–10 at Wembley Conference Centre on 7 November 1999, to be unofficially crowned the first ever undisputed World Champion since the 1993 split in darts.

In a further head-to-head on 21 November 2004 at the Circus Tavern, via the first ever darts pay-per-view on Sky Box Office, Phil Taylor again prevailed after his opponent Andy Fordham had to retire during the match due to dehydration.

The immense heat took its toll on the 30-stone (420 lbs/191 kg) Fordham. Phil Taylor was leading the match 5–2 in sets before it was unexpectedly abandoned.

Masters of Darts

This event was staged twice in 2005 and 2007. In the 2005 Masters of Darts event four top players from both darts circuits together for the first major tournament confrontation since the two organisations separated.

The players were split into two groups, sharing it with only members of their affiliated organisation. Each player then vied against all players from the opposition, with one point awarded for winning a match. Following conclusion of the format, the winner of each respective group played the runner-up at the semi-final stage.

The Professional Darts Corporation pool consisted of Colin Lloyd, Wayne Mardle, Roland Scholten and Phil Taylor; whilst for the British Darts Organisation it was Tony David, Andy Fordham, Co Stompé and Raymond van Barneveld.

In a rematch of their unfinished 2004 head-to-head clash, Phil Taylor beat Andy Fordham convincingly in the final, 7–1, to be crowned the first Master of Darts. While beating Raymond van Barneveld (BDO World Champion at the time) 4–0 and 5–2 along the way, the undefeated Taylor only lost 5 sets during the entire tournament.

This event was broadcast to viewers in The Netherlands via RTL 5. Surprisingly, no British broadcaster had agreed television coverage of this unique event. The tournament was not held in 2006, however it returned in February 2007 as a Netherlands versus England encounter with five players from each country. Originally announced with a mixture of PDC and BDO players, the BDO players had all switched to the PDC by the time the event began.

World Darts Trophy

This tournament began as a BDO event. The tournament ran from 2002 to 2007. PDC players received invitations to play in the 2006 and 2007 editions of the event.

International Darts League

This tournament began as a BDO event. The tournament ran from 2003 to 2007. PDC players received invitations to play in the 2006 and 2007 editions of the event.

Home Tour

In April 2020, the PDC announced that they would be launching a new tournament starting on 17 April 2020, after most sport had been cancelled due to the COVID-19 outbreak. The home tour would see four players in action each night in a league format, before a knockout stage. The unique feature of this tournament is that player would be playing from their own homes for the first time in a darts tournament.

PDC Hall of Fame
In 2005, the PDC introduced a Hall of Fame similar to other sports to recognise individuals with noteworthy contributions to darts.

The first two inductees were Eric Bristow and John Lowe, great rivals throughout the eighties and early nineties – at least one of these two players managed to reach the World Championship Final each year for the first 14 incarnations of the World Professional Darts Championship, from 1978 to 1991, with three being played against each other.

Hall of Fame inductees are now announced at the PDC Awards Dinner – which was held for the first time on 9 January 2007.

As of 2021, there have been 17 inductees

Roll of Honour

Premier Event Title Roll of Honour

37 players have won at least one PDC major televised event, those players are:

Seven of these players have successfully defended a title at least once:  Phil Taylor, Michael van Gerwen, Gary Anderson, Adrian Lewis, Rod Harrington, Gerwyn Price and Raymond van Barneveld

World Series Roll of Honour
13 different players have won events on the World Series of Darts, excluding the Premier event, the World Series of Darts Finals.

European Tour Roll of Honour
Only twelve players have won multiple European Tour events, as listed below.

An additional 20 players have won a single title. That list is composed of Justin Pipe, Raymond van Barneveld, Adrian Lewis, Simon Whitlock, John Part, Wes Newton, Steve Beaton, Gary Anderson, Vincent van der Voort, Mervyn King, Robert Thornton, Alan Norris, Max Hopp, Jonny Clayton, Daryl Gurney, Jamie Hughes, Krzysztof Ratajski, Devon Petersen, José de Sousa and Damon Heta.

See also
British Darts Organisation
World Darts Federation
List of darts players
Nine-dart finish

References

External links
Professional Darts Corporation Ltd. – official website
Professional Darts Corporation  – YouTube

 
1992 establishments in the United Kingdom
Borough of Brentwood
Darts in the United Kingdom
Darts organizations
Organisations based in Essex
Sports organizations established in 1992
Sports organisations of the United Kingdom